Olamide Zaccheaus (born July 23, 1997) is an American football wide receiver for the Atlanta Falcons of the National Football League (NFL). He played college football at Virginia.

Zaccheaus had lived with his family in Plainfield, New Jersey, before moving at age seven to Magnolia, New Jersey.

College career
Zaccheaus was a member of the Virginia Cavaliers for four seasons. He was named second team All-Atlantic Coast Conference (ACC) after catching 85 passes for 895 yards and five touchdowns. As a senior, Zaccheaus led the Atlantic Coast Conference with 93 receptions for 1,058 yards and nine touchdowns and was named first team All-ACC. He was named the Most Valuable Player of the 2018 Belk Bowl, his final game as a Cavalier, after making 12 receptions for 100 yards receiving and three touchdowns. Zaccheaus finished his collegiate career with 250 receptions for 2,753 yards and 22 touchdowns while also rushing 79 times for 551 yards and two touchdowns in 50 games played.

Professional career

2019
Zaccheaus signed with the Atlanta Falcons as an undrafted free agent on April 27, 2019, and made the 53-man roster out of training camp. Zaccheaus made his NFL debut on October 13, 2019, against the Arizona Cardinals, making a tackle on special teams. In the Falcons' 40–20 victory against the Carolina Panthers on December 8, 2019, Zaccheaus recorded his first reception in the NFL, a 93-yard touchdown pass from Matt Ryan, which was the third-longest reception in franchise history, and set an NFL record for the longest first catch. In Week 15 against the San Francisco 49ers, Zaccheaus returned a fumble for a touchdown in the closing seconds of the 29–22 win. Zaccheaus finished his rookie season with three receptions for 115 yards and a touchdown on offense and two tackles and a fumble recovery for a touchdown on special teams.

2020
In Week 9 against the Denver Broncos, Zaccheaus had his first 100-yard game with four receptions for 103 receiving yards and a touchdown in the 34–27 victory. He was placed on injured reserve on December 1, 2020. Zaccheaus finished the season with 20 receptions for 274 yards and one touchdown in 11 games played.

2021 
In Week 8 against the New Orleans Saints, Zaccheaus had three receptions for 58 yards and a career-high two touchdowns in the 27–25 win.  Zaccheaus finished the season with 31 receptions for 406 yards and three touchdowns.

2022
On March 15, 2022, the Falcons placed a restricted free agent tender on Zaccheaus. On April 19, 2022, Zaccheaus signed his right-of-refusal tender, ensuring his return to the Falcons.  Zaccheaus played in all 17 games, of which he started 13. He finished with 40 receptions for 533 receiving yards and three receiving touchdowns.

References

External links

Atlanta Falcons bio
Virginia Cavaliers bio

1997 births
Living people
American football wide receivers
Atlanta Falcons players
Virginia Cavaliers football players
Players of American football from New Jersey
Sportspeople from Camden County, New Jersey
Sportspeople from Plainfield, New Jersey
St. Joseph's Preparatory School alumni